"Little by Little" is a song by the Rolling Stones recorded on 4 February 1964.  Decca Records released it as the B-side to their version of "Not Fade Away" on 21 February 1964. The title stems from an identically titled track by Junior Wells and Earl Hooker, with the rhythmic similarity to "Shame, Shame, Shame" by Jimmy Reed, a song which was released the previous year. Reed was not credited for the song, however, Phil Spector was given co-credit with "Nanker Phelge" (a pseudonym for songs credited to the whole group). The song is also included on their April 1964 debut album The Rolling Stones.

In April 1964, "Not Fade Away" became their first Top 5 hit in the United Kingdom, where it reached number three.

Personnel
The Rolling Stones
Mick Jaggervocals, harmonica
Keith Richardslead guitar
Brian Jonesrhythm guitar
Bill Wymanbass guitar
Charlie Wattsdrums
Additional personnel
 Ian Stewartpiano
 Phil Spectormaracas
 Gene Pitneypiano
 Andrew Loog Oldhamproducer

Notes and references

 Carr, Roy, The Rolling Stones, an Illustrated Record, New English Library, London 1976

1964 songs
The Rolling Stones songs
Decca Records singles
Songs written by Jagger–Richards
Song recordings produced by Andrew Loog Oldham
Songs written by Phil Spector